Samuel Lee (August 1, 1920 – December 2, 2016) was an American physician and diver. He was the first Asian American man to win an Olympic gold medal for the United States (the second Asian American to win a gold medal overall) and the first man to win back-to-back gold medals in Olympic platform diving.

Early life and education
Lee was born in Fresno, California to parents of Korean descent who owned what he described as "a little chop suey restaurant". His father was fluent in English and Korean, tutored in French, graduated with a degree in civil engineering from Occidental College, and opened a chop suey restaurant and market. As a twelve-year-old living near Los Angeles in 1932, Lee saw and was motivated by the many Olympics banners and souvenirs on display for the Summer Olympics being held in Los Angeles that year. Later that summer, he found that he could do somersaults much better than all of his friends, which led to his goal of becoming an Olympic champion in diving.

Lee's parents moved to Highland Park, a neighborhood of Los Angeles. At the time, however, Latinos, Asians and African-Americans were only allowed to use the nearby Brookside Park Plunge in Pasadena on Wednesdays, on what was called "international day,” the day before the pool was scheduled to be drained and refilled with clean water. Because Lee needed a place to practice and could not regularly use the public pool, his coach dug a pit in his backyard and filled it with sand. Lee practiced by jumping into the pit.

Lee attended Franklin High School and later was a student-athlete at Occidental, where he received his undergraduate degree before attending the University of Southern California School of Medicine, where he received his M.D. in 1947.
He joined the Army Reserve to pay for his medical school tuition.

Diving career

Under the tutelage of renowned diving coach Jim Ryan, Lee won the United States National Diving Championships in 1942 in both the 3-meter springboard and the 10-meter platform events, becoming the first person of color to capture the United States national championship in diving. In 1946, he again triumphed at the 10-meter platform event while finishing third at the 3-meter springboard competition at the national diving competition in San Diego.

At the 1948 Summer Olympics in London, England, Lee earned a bronze medal in the 3-meter springboard and a gold medal in 10-meter platform diving events.  In so doing, he became the second Asian American to earn a gold medal, behind only Vicki Draves, who won an Olympic gold medal two days earlier in springboard diving.

Military and medical careers
Four years later, by then a major in the United States Army Medical Corps, he expected to serve in the Korean War, but he was instead sent to compete in the Olympic Games ("but you better win", he was told). He won the gold medal in the 10-meter platform competition at the Olympics in Helsinki, Finland.

Lee served in the U.S. Army Medical Corps in South Korea from 1953 to 1955, where he specialized in diseases of the ear. In 1953, while serving his tour of duty in Korea, he won the James E. Sullivan Award in 1953, which is awarded annually by the Amateur Athletic Union to the most outstanding amateur athlete in the United States.

He continued to experience discrimination in later life. In 1954, he faced housing discrimination in Garden Grove, California, where he attempted to buy a home only to be told that he could not, and in one case having nearby residents gather petition signatures to "disallow" or discourage him from buying in "their" neighborhood. (In the latter case, a counterpetition sought to rectify this prejudice, but the discriminatory effect had been achieved, and Lee looked elsewhere.)

Lee practiced as an ear, nose and throat doctor for 35 years before retiring in 1990.

Coaching
Following Lee's diving career, he helped coach two-time diving gold medalist Bob Webster. Later, he coached Greg Louganis, who lived with Lee's family before winning a silver medal in platform diving at the 1976 Olympics at the age of 16. Lee also coached Olympic medalist Pat McCormick.

In 1979, Lee played himself in Silent Victory: The Kitty O'Neil Story, about stuntwoman Kitty O'Neil, whom Lee had coached in diving. In 1996 Lee was interviewed by Huell Howser in California's Gold Episode 702.

Honors and awards
Lee was inducted into the International Swimming Hall of Fame in 1968, and was inducted into the U.S. Olympic Hall of Fame in 1990.

Sammy Lee Square, at the corner of Olympic Boulevard and Normandie Avenue in Los Angeles' Koreatown, was named after him in 2010. He was also honored with a spot on the Anaheim/Orange County Walk of Stars in 2009. The Los Angeles Unified School District honored Lee by renaming Central Region Elementary School #20 as the Dr. Sammy Lee Medical and Health Sciences Magnet School in 2013.

Personal life and death
Lee was married to Rosalind Wong; the couple had a daughter and had a son. Lee died from complications of pneumonia on December 2, 2016 at his home in Newport Beach, California, aged 96. He also suffered from dementia and heart disease.

See also
 List of members of the International Swimming Hall of Fame

References

Further reading

External links

 
 
 
 

1920 births
2016 deaths
American male divers
Olympic gold medalists for the United States in diving
Olympic bronze medalists for the United States in diving
Divers at the 1948 Summer Olympics
Divers at the 1952 Summer Olympics
Medalists at the 1948 Summer Olympics
Medalists at the 1952 Summer Olympics
James E. Sullivan Award recipients
Physicians from California
American physicians of Korean descent
United States Army personnel of the Korean War
United States Army Medical Corps officers
Occidental College alumni
Keck School of Medicine of USC alumni
Sportspeople from Fresno, California
American sportspeople of Korean descent
Divers at the 1951 Pan American Games
Pan American Games medalists in diving
Pan American Games silver medalists for the United States
Pan American Games bronze medalists for the United States
Medalists at the 1951 Pan American Games
People with dementia
Deaths from pneumonia in California
Military personnel from California